The 1960–61 season was Sport Lisboa e Benfica's 57th season in existence and the club's 27th consecutive season in the top flight of Portuguese football, covering the period from 1 August 1960 to 30 July 1961. Benfica competed domestically in the Primeira Divisão and the Taça de Portugal and participated in the European Cup after winning the previous league.

After promising to win the European Cup the year before, Guttmann made almost no changes, only signing centre-back Germano. A dominant league campaign saw Benfica lap the first half with 12 wins in 13 games. A loss in January did not stop their momentum, and they added five more wins in the following weeks. On day 22, they drew with Sporting, and a week later they sealed their second consecutive league title. José Águas scored a league best 27 goals. Meanwhile, in Europe, Benfica defeated Hearts, Újpesti Dózsa, and AGF on their way to a semi-final with Rapid Wien. They won three-nil at home and drew one-all in Vienna, qualifying for the European Cup Final, where they would meet favourites Barcelona. A 3–2 win secured their historic first European Cup.

Season summary
After Béla Guttmann led Benfica to the league title in 1959–60, he set his eyes on winning the European Cup, a promise he made when he first arrived at Benfica. In his second year, he recruited Fernando Caiado as assistant, due to his connection with the players, and said to him: "Caiado, help me because I am going to make Benfica the European Champion". He only made one signing for the first team, centre-back, Germano. The season began on 27 August with a game against Barreirense. After other matches, Benfica ended the pre-season with the Taça de Honra, which they finished third. Despite the focus in Europe, Benfica domestic performance was dominant with 12 wins and one draw in the first half of the league.  At the same time, they eliminated Hearts in the preliminary round of the European Cup, and Újpesti Dózsa in the first round. In the first leg, at home, Benfica build up a 5–0 lead in 28 minutes. The second half of the league was less imposing, with Benfica conceding their first loss with Vitória de Guimarães. This was followed by five consecutive wins. In Europe, they had no difficulties in quarter-finals with the Danish AGF, beating them by 4–1 at their own home. In April, Benfica wrapped up the league, after drawing with Sporting CP on match-day 22, keeping a five-point lead. A week later, they beat Braga by 7–1 and won the league with three match-days to go, a new club record. José Águas was Bola de Prata for league top-scorer with 27 goals. With the league conquered, Benfica met Rapid Wien in semi-finals, beating them at home by 3–0. In Vienna, the match was abandoned on the 88th minute, with the score on 1–1, after Rapid fans invaded the pitch. Qualified for the European Cup Final, they would face favourites FC Barcelona, who had eliminated five-time winners and title-holders Real Madrid. On 31 May 1961, Barcelona scored first, but Benfica levelled by José Águas after a cross from Cavém. In the next minute, José Neto set up a long ball for Santana, with Barcelona defender, Enric Gensana heading it backwards into his own goal. In the second half, Cavém crossed another ball from the left, reaching Coluna, who waited at the front of the box, to score the 3–1. Barcelona brought it down to 3–2, but no more goals occurred with Benfica winning their first ever European Cup. Benfica played the second leg of the third round of the Portuguese Cup the very next day, with all the team still in Vienna, because the Portuguese Football Federation (FPF) would not postpone it. Entirely composed of reserve players, it marked the debut of Eusébio after five months of legal battle for his signing. He scored once, and Benfica lost 4–1. The season final game was with Belenenses in which Benfica won, therefore ending the league with a four-point lead over Sporting and 13 over Porto.

Competitions

Overall record

Primeira Divisão

League table

Results by round

Matches

Taça de Portugal

First round

Second round

Third round

European Cup

Preliminary round

First round

Quarter-final

Semi-final

Final

Friendlies

Player statistics
The squad for the season consisted of the players listed in the tables below, as well as staff member Béla Guttman (manager),  Fernando Cabrita (assistant manager).

|}

Transfers

In

Out

Notes

References

Bibliography
 
 
 

S.L. Benfica seasons
Benfica
UEFA Champions League-winning seasons
Portuguese football championship-winning seasons